A training field is a type of outdoor training facility typically used by a military, paramilitary, or militia to train or organize soldiers and recruits. Training fields were common until after World War II, when the need for mass training of troops was reduced, and military training and organization moved to dedicated, permanent training facilities.

The term "training field" may also refer to outdoor training facilities used for sports that are often played in fields, such as track and field and association football, though these are more specifically called training camps and training grounds.

Historical value 
In the American region of New England, many towns and cities have kept and maintained the training fields that served as the training grounds for soldiers, militia, and townspeople during former wars, including the American War of Independence, the War of 1812, and the American Civil War.

Today, these areas are normally designated as, or part of, historical sites. They may include war memorials dedicated to veterans or statues of important figures in past wars, such as George Washington or the Marquis de Lafayette. They may also include preexisting or rebuilt structures, or restored weaponry on static display, such as centuries-old cannons or outdated armored fighting vehicles.

Oftentimes, training fields are still used for public gatherings or as parks. Other times, they may still be part of existing military installations.

New England
History of New England